Felipe Carrillo Puerto is the municipal seat and largest city in Felipe Carrillo Puerto Municipality in the Mexican state of Quintana Roo. According to the 2010 census, the city's population was 25,744 persons, mostly of Maya descent.

The city  of Felipe Carrillo Puerto was founded in 1850 by independent Maya people during the Caste War of Yucatán under the name Chan Santa Cruz. After it was conquered by Mexican troops in 1901, it was renamed "Santa Cruz del Bravo" before acquiring its present name. The Sian Ka'an Biosphere Reserve lies just east of the city.

Climate

References

Notes

External links
 

Populated places in Quintana Roo
1850 establishments in Mexico